The Dowager Stakes is a Grade III American Thoroughbred horse race for fillies and mares that are three years old or older, over a distance of  miles on the turf held annually in October at Keeneland Race Course, Lexington, Kentucky during the autumn meeting.  The event currently carries a purse of $300,000.

History 
The race was inaugurated in 1992 and the event was run over the  miles
distance.

In 1994 the event was extended to the current distance of  miles.

In 2015 the event was upgraded to a Grade III.

Records
Speed record: 
  miles – 2:27.98 - Temple City Terror  (2022)

Margins: 
 7 lengths – Casablanca Smile (2010)

Most wins by a jockey
 4 – Shane Sellers  (1994, 1995, 1996, 1999)

Most wins by a trainer
 3 – Patrick B. Byrne (1996, 1997, 2000)
 3 – William I. Mott (2005, 2013, 2014)
 3 – H. Graham Motion (2004, 2015, 2020)

Most wins by an owner
 2 – Augustin Stable   (2007, 2015)
 2 – H. Joseph Allen (2006, 2017)

Winners

Notes

See also 
 List of American and Canadian Graded races

References

Graded stakes races in the United States
Grade 3 stakes races in the United States
Recurring sporting events established in 1992
Keeneland horse races
1992 establishments in Kentucky
Turf races in the United States
Horse races in Kentucky
Long-distance horse races for fillies and mares